Morgan Bassichis (born 1983) is an American comedic performer and writer, living and working in New York City.

Early life
Bassichis was born in Newton, MA in 1983. Bassichis actively participated in theater growing up. Their parents were progressive social workers.

They inherited political zeal and musical taste from their mother. After graduating from college, they worked for ten years as an anti-prison activist and educator in San Francisco.

Artistic practice

Performances
Whitney Biennial (2019) - curated by Rujeko Hockley and Jane Panetta
Damned If You Duet - The Kitchen - (2018)
More Protest Songs! - Danspace Project - (2018)
Me But Also Everybody (Part IV) - Hirshhorn Museum and Sculpture Garden - (2018)
The Faggots & Their Friends Between Revolutions: The Musical - the New Museum - (2017)
Senior Energy - Portland Institute for Contemporary Art - (2017)
Me, But Also Everybody! (Part II) - MoMA PS1 - (2015)

Grants, residencies, & awards
Robert Rauschenberg Foundation - 2017 Resident
Art Matters Foundation - 2015 Grantee
Lower Manhattan Cultural Council - 2015 Process Space Artist

Writing 

 The Odd Years (Wendy's Subway, 2020)
 Essay in The Faggots & Their Friends Between Revolutions (Nightboat Books, reissue, 1977/2019)

References

External links
Morgan Bassichis by Katherine Brewer Ball - BOMB magazine

Living people
Bard College alumni
American contemporary artists
American LGBT artists
Transgender artists
Transgender women
Transgender writers
1983 births